A referendum bill is a bill (proposed law) that puts forth a call for a referendum

 Independence referendum bill
 2014 Scottish independence referendum
 1995 Quebec referendum's bill that established the referendum law
 1980 Quebec referendum's bill that established the referendum law
 European Union (Referendum) Bill 2013–14, of the United Kingdom
 Daylight Saving for South East Queensland Referendum Act 2010
 Czech European Constitution referendum bill